Clifford Lloyd  (14 November 1916 – 10 January 2000) was a Welsh footballer, best known for his association with Wrexham. He was also involved with the PFA, as secretary of the players' trade union.

In 1936, Lloyd was signed for Liverpool, but did not make an appearance for the side. When the war broke in 1939, Lloyd joined the Army. He made guest appearances for Wrexham, Brentford and Fulham, signing for the Cottagers when the war ended. He briefly managed Lisleby, before returning to Wrexham. He was a secretary of the club from 1949 to 1973, and also managed them from 1955 to 1957, with caretaker spells in 1950, 1959, 1965, and 1967.

Within the PFA, he was secretary (later chief executive) of the players' trade union from 1953 to 1981, with Gordon Taylor replacing him in the role. His most significant contribution in the role came in 1963, when he served as a witness in the High Court, regarding the transfer of George Eastham, who successfully challenged the League's retain and transfer system, and made it possible for players to move at the end of their contracts.

References

1916 births
2000 deaths
Liverpool F.C. players
Wrexham A.F.C. players
Fulham F.C. players
Welsh footballers
Wrexham A.F.C. managers
Welsh football managers
Brentford F.C. wartime guest players
British Army personnel of World War II
Association football defenders